Robin Arora (born January 1985) is a British businessman and director of the retail chain B&M.

Early life
Born in Manchester, Arora is the youngest of three brothers, Simon Arora and Bobby Arora. Before going into business, he studied business at the University of Reading.

His brothers acquired B&M Stores in December 2004 from Phildrew Investments.

Career
Arora joined the business alongside his brothers in 2008, and was appointed a director at B&M Stores in 2014.

Personal life
In 2013, Arora become the UK's first billionaire under the age of 30.

In 2014, Tatler described Arora as "a Woosterish wag with a strong line in tartan blazers".

In 2015, he married Esha Arora, nee Babber.

References

1985 births
Living people
British businesspeople
British billionaires